Kåfjorden, Gáivuotna or Kaivuono is a fjord in the municipality of Gáivuotna-Kåfjord-Kaivuono in Troms og Finnmark county, Norway. The European route E06 highway runs around the entire fjord.

See also
 List of Norwegian fjords

References

Fjords of Troms og Finnmark
Gáivuotna–Kåfjord